The 1999 WPA World Nine-ball Championship was a professional pool championship that took place in 1999 in Alicante, Spain. The event is not to be confused with Matchroom Sport 1999 World Professional Pool Championship that took the same year, won by Efren Reyes. Despite there being two world title for the same discipline in 1999, both are considered as valid in 1999 by the World Pool-Billiard Association.

The event was won by Nick Varner, who defeated compatriot Jeremy Jones in the final 13–8. Defending champion Takahashi Kunihiko was defeated in the last 16 13–2 by Varner.

Knockout stages
The following is the results from the knockout stages. Players competing had progressed through the earlier knockout round. All matches were played as race to 13 racks.

References

External links
 WPA World Nine-ball championships at azbilliards.com

1999
WPA World Nine-ball Championship
WPA World Nine-ball Championship
International sports competitions hosted by Spain